Carnival Sensation, initially named Sensation, was a  cruise ship operated by Carnival Cruise Line. She was built in 1993 in Finland and cruised from Florida, USA to ports in the Bahamas and the Caribbean until the COVID-19 pandemic stopped operations in March 2020. The ship was subsequently sold for scrapping.

Construction
Sensation was the third  operated by Carnival. Built by Kværner Masa-Yards at its Helsinki New Shipyard in Helsinki, Finland, she was floated out on November 1, 1993, and christened Sensation by four Carnival Vice Presidents: Vicki L. Freed, Roberta Jacoby, Cherie Weinstein and Geri Donnelly.

Service history
Sensation was one of several cruise ships chartered by the US Government in 2005 to provide accommodation for residents and relief workers following Hurricane Katrina. After being released from Federal Emergency Management Agency service, the Carnival Sensation undertook cruises from Port Canaveral.

During 2007, in common with all of her Fantasy-class sisters, she had the prefix Carnival added to her name.

In early 2016, Carnival Sensation moved to Miami, replacing the Carnival Victory, doing 4 and 5 night cruises. Carnival Victory took over the 3- and 4-night cruises to Nassau and Freeport, Bahamas, in the Bahamas. 

In February 2018, the company announced that Carnival Sensation would take 17 sailings to Cuba in 2019.

In July 2020, the company announced that Carnival Sensation would move to Mobile, Alabama to replace Carnival Fantasy at the Alabama Cruise Terminal. Carnival Fantasy was retired and sold amid the ongoing COVID-19 pandemic. Carnival Sensation was to take over itineraries already scheduled aboard Carnival Fantasy and Carnival Fascination. However, it was announced in February 2022, that Carnival would retire both Carnival Sensation as well as Carnival Ecstasy from the fleet. The latter would remain in service until October 2022, and Carnival Sensation would not return to service. In February 2022 it was reported that the ship had been sold for US$11 million, and on March 18, 2022 sailed from Miami for Aliağa, Turkey, for demolition. It was beached on April 5, 2022.

References

Notes

Bibliography

External links

Former official website

Ships built in Helsinki
Sensation
Sensation
1993 ships